State Road 9 (NM 9) is a  state road in the U.S. state of New Mexico. The highway spans Hidalgo, Grant, and Luna counties from its western terminus at NM 80 to its eastern terminus at CR A003 at the Doña Ana county line. NM 9 and NM 338 are the only remaining New Mexico State Roads to form a concurrency.

Route description

NM 9 highway generally follows the abandoned railway line built in 1901-02 by El Paso & South Western as the route from Douglas, through New Mexico to El Paso. The railroad was abandoned in 1961 due to lack of cargo, and the railroad tracks were removed a year later.

The highway's western terminus is at NM 80 north of Rodeo, in the San Simon Valley close to the border with Arizona. The route then climbs through Antelope Pass, a gap in the Peloncillo Mountains, into the Animas Valley where it intersects with NM 338 in the town of Animas. A few miles east of Animas, the road again climbs and crosses the Continental Divide the first of three times, then intersects with NM 113 (which goes northbound to I-10). Continuing east, the road crosses the Continental Divide twice in less than 2 miles (3 km), then descends to the Hachita Valley. 

In Hachita, the road intersects first with NM 146 (which goes northbound to I-10), then with NM 81 (which goes south to Antelope Wells, and into Mexico). From Hachita, NM 9 continues ESE, then generally East to Columbus, where it intersects with NM 11 (which goes north to Deming and south to Puerto Palomas). East of Columbus, NM 9 stays within  of the Mexican border. NM 9 officially ends at the Dona Ana County line, but the road continues as Dona Ana County Road A003 to the Pete Domenici Highway (NM 136) just west of El Paso.

Major intersections

See also

References

External links

009
Transportation in Grant County, New Mexico
Transportation in Hidalgo County, New Mexico
Transportation in Luna County, New Mexico